Marsiglia is the Italian name of the French city of Marseille.

Marsiglia may also refer to:

Places
Marsiglia (Davagna), an Italian village and hamlet of Davagna, Liguria
Stadio di Corso Marsiglia, an Italian football stadium in Turin, Piedmont

People
Guglielmo da Marsiglia (1475–1537), Italian painter of stained glass
Mickaël Marsiglia (born 1975), French footballer
Renato Marsiglia (born 1951), retired Brazilian football referee
René Marsiglia (1959–2016), French football manager
 (born 1943), Italian actor who appeared in Paulo Roberto Cotechiño centravanti di sfondamento

See also
Marseille (disambiguation)
Massilia (disambiguation)
Morsiglia, a French municipality in Corsica